Setia subvaricosa is a species of minute sea snail, a marine gastropod mollusk or micromollusk in the family Rissoidae.

Description

Distribution

References

 Gofas S. (1990). The littoral Rissoidae and Anabathridae of Sao Miguel, Azores. In: Proceedings lrst international workshop on malacology, Sao Miguel, July 1988. Açoreana, Ponta Delgada suplemento: 97–134, 73 fig page(s): 102–104, 127

Rissoidae
Gastropods described in 1990